The Jubilee Trophy is the Canadian national championship for women's amateur soccer teams, first held in 1982. It is held concurrently to the national men's amateur Challenge Trophy.

Participants 
Eight teams are granted entry into the competition; one from each Canadian province excluding New Brunswick and Prince Edward Island.

Teams are selected by their provincial soccer associations; most often qualifying by winning provincial leagues or cup championships such as the Ontario Cup.

Tournament format 
The tournament is divided into two stages; a group stage and a classification stage. In the group stage, the eight teams are divided into two groups of four teams, which then play a single-game round robin format.

At the end of the stage, each team advances to the classification round and plays against the team from the other group with the corresponding ranking to determine overall standings for the tournament.

Past winners 

Source:

References

Soccer cup competitions in Canada